The Provalvatidae is an extinct taxonomic family of aquatic snails, gastropod mollusks in the informal group Lower Heterobranchia.

References 

 The Taxonomicon